Catholic Answers is a Catholic advocacy group based in El Cajon, California. It describes itself as the largest lay-run apostolate of Catholic apologetics and evangelization in the United States. It publishes Catholic Answers Magazine, a bimonthly magazine focusing on Catholic outreach, religious formation and apologetics, as well as the website catholic.com. It also produces Catholic Answers Live, a radio show answering callers' questions on a variety of topics related to the doctrines and practices of the Catholic Church. Catholic Answers Live is syndicated on the EWTN radio network.

History
Catholic Answers was founded in 1979 by Karl Keating in response to a fundamentalist Protestant church in San Diego that was distributing anti-Catholic propaganda in the form of tracts placed on the cars of Catholics attending Mass. He first started by writing a modest tract titled "Catholic Answers" to counter the arguments he saw in the anti-Catholic tract. He distributed it on the windshields of the cars in the fundamentalist Protestant church's parking lot. Due to the feedback he received from that tract, he published 24 more tracts. In 1988 he quit his law practice and turned Catholic Answers into a full-time apostolate, with an office and full-time staff.

The Catholic.com website receives approximately 471,000 visitors per month in an October 2012 estimate.

Staff
Apologists who have worked for Catholic Answers include Trent Hornand Jimmy Akin.

See also
 Lighthouse Catholic Media

References

External links

Catholic Answers' forums 
Catholic Answers' Original Catholic Encyclopedia

Catholic websites
Catholic advocacy groups
Christian organizations established in 1979
1979 establishments in the United States
El Cajon, California
Christian apologetics
Catholic publishing companies
Anti-Catholicism in the United States